Jeffrey J. Wine is an American biologist and professor. He is currently at Stanford University and an Elected Fellow of the American Association for the Advancement of Science. His research has focused on the genetic disease cystic fibrosis.

References

External links 
 

Year of birth missing (living people)
Living people
Fellows of the American Association for the Advancement of Science
Stanford University faculty
21st-century American biologists
University of California, Los Angeles alumni